Edward Hyde "Ned" Rice (October 27, 1847 – May 9, 1895) was an American academic who led many institutions of secondary education in Massachusetts

Early life and education
He was born in Boston, the second son of the Rev. William Rice and Caroline Laura North. His siblings included William North Rice, Charles Francis Rice and Catherine Laura Rice.

He graduated from the Springfield High School in 1866 and from Wesleyan University in 1870. He was a member of Phi Beta Kappa and the Eclectic Society, for which he composed the song "Tis Pleasant to Clasp the Hand of a Brother." From 1873–1875, he studied in the universities of Berlin, Leipzig, and France, and earned a Ph.D. from the College de France in Paris.

Career
He was widely known in local public schools. From 1870–71, he served as principle of Holliston High School in Holliston, MA, then in 1871–72 as principle of Malden High School in Malden, MA. Following further study in Europe from 1873–1875, he was principle of the high school in Chicopee, MA from 1875–1879, in Lawrence, MA from 1879-1880, and Pittsfield High School, in Pittsfield, MA in 1881.

He was Classical Master of the High School in Worcester, MA. Later, he was a Professor of Greek at the Western University of Pennsylvania. For the last two years of his life, he taught privately in Springfield, MA.

He served on the Board of Visitors of Boston University from 1880–1881, and also worked in his father's library, the Springfield City Library. In 1874, he wrote an article, "Our Public Schools" in The Massachusetts Teacher: A Journal of School and Home Education, in which he discussed the schools of the state, and compared them favorably to several European countries. In 1875, he became a Freemason.

Family life
He married Emma Isabelle Adams in Springfield on August 12, 1878. After his death, she lived on Vernon Street in Newton.

He died in Springfield in 1895, predeceasing his father by two years and his mother by four. His funeral was held at his parents' house at 54 Court Street, and he was buried in the Springfield Cemetery.

Genealogy
Edward Hyde Rice was a direct descendant of Edmund Rice, an English immigrant to Massachusetts Bay Colony, as follows:

 Edward Hyde Rice, son of
 William Rice (1821–1897), son of
 William Rice (1788–1863), son of
 Nathan Rice (1760–1838), son of
 John Rice (1704–1771), son of
 Ephraim Rice (1665–1732), son of
 Thomas Rice (1625–1681), son of
 Edmund Rice (1594–1663)

References

American educators
1847 births
1895 deaths
University of Pittsburgh faculty